Émilienne de Sère was a French operetta and café-concert singer active from 1894 to 1904.

Life 

Sère made her debut at the Menus-Plaisirs in the revue Que d'eau ! Que d'eau ! She then moved on to various other stages and sang in Parisian salons. She entered the Théâtre-Moderne, from where she left for Bucharest, where she was offered a favourable engagement. On her return, she stayed away from the theatre. Édouard Marchand hired her for the Trouville-sur-Mer Casino season, and the Scala (Paris) in 1895.

She sang at the Casino de Paris in 1898 and created the role of Thaïs in the bouffe fantasy Othello chez Thaïs at the Bouffes de Bordeaux the same year.

She led the revue Bruxelles ! tout le monde… monte, at the Cirque Royal in Brussels for 3 months in 1904. She performed again at the London Palace Theatre in 1904.

References

External links 

19th-century French women singers
19th-century births
20th-century deaths
Place of birth missing